Saclà Italia is an Italian pesto and pasta sauce brand. Saclà was founded by Secondo and his wife Piera in Asti, Piedmont in north-west Italy  in 1939. Saclà is still run by the founding family, and all products are made in Italy to traditional recipes using fresh ingredients. 
Sacla' UK are the distributors of the products in the UK and have been doing so in the country since 1991.

Products 
The Saclà product range includes Pesto, Big Bold Italian Sauces, Intense Pastes, Risotto Sauces, Free From, Whole Cherry Tomato sauces and Antipasti.
In 2009 Saclà teamed up with Lawrence Dallaglio to produce a new range of pasta sauces called Dallaglio by Saclà. In 2011 Saclà launched a range of fresh pesto, pasta sauces and pasta to the chilled cabinet.

Pesto 

In 2011 this range was voted the UK's favourite ready-made sauce by Good Housekeeping readers. There are eight pesto recipes and two organic: Classic Basil Pesto, Sun-Dried Tomato Pesto, Fiery Chilli Pesto, Char-Grilled Aubergine Pesto, Fresh Coriander Pesto, Roasted Red Pepper Pesto, Black Olive Pesto, Truffle Pesto, and 'Nduja Pesto, and the two organic pesto sauces are Basil Pesto and Tomato Pesto.
In 2015, Sacla' launched a range of Pesto Shots, in an innovative single serve packaging format.

Intenso Stir Through 
This range was the winner of the 2009 'Good Housekeeping Cookery Teams Favourite' award. Flavours include: Vine Ripened Tomato and Chilli, Vine Ripened Tomato and Mascarpone and Italian Tomato and Olive.

Intense Paste 
Sacla' has one Sun-Dried Tomato Cook's Paste.

Antipasti 
The Sacla' antipasti range includes: Sun-Dried Tomatoes, Oven Roasted Tomatoes, Artichokes and Char-Grilled Peppers.

Whole Cherry Tomato Sauces 
These sauces are made with whole cherry tomatoes and a soffritto base of virgin olive oil, celery, carrots and onions. There are four recipes. Traditional Tomato and Basil, Tomato and Parmesan, Tomato and Chilli, Tomato and Burrata and Tomato and 'Nduja.

Pronto Pasta Stir-in sauces 
There are three pasta sauces in the range: Sun-dried tomato & Italian basil, spicy pepper & smoked garlic and vine ripened tomato & pancetta.

Free From Sacla' range 
Launched in 2014, the Free From Pesto range has won multiple awards and commendations for its great taste, including a Healthy Food Guide and Great Taste Award. The full range includes Gluten, Dairy and Wheat Free Basil Pesto and Tomato Pesto, Free From Bolognese sauce, Free From Besciamella Sauce (not dairy free), Free From Creamy Whole Cherry Tomato Pasta Sauce, Free From Creamy Tomato Stir-in and Free From Basil Pesto and Tomato Stir-in.

Sacla' Professionale 
Sacla' Professionale is a range of Products designed for Food Service, launched in 2015. The range includes authentic products from Italy from Pesto to Black eyed peas  & as well as Galvanina soft drinks, which Sacla' import into the UK

Sustainability 
The Sacla' family has fitted solar panels on the roof of one of the main buildings to harness the Italian sunshine. Most Saclà products are packed in glass so are fully recyclable.

References

External links 
 www.sacla.co.uk
 www.sacla.com

Food product brands
Food and drink companies of Italy